Christe is a surname. Notable people with the surname include:

 Ian Christe (born 1970), Swiss author and disk jockey
 Karl O. Christe (born 1936), German-American inorganic chemist

See also
 Christie (surname)
 Cristi (name)